The 1979 Davidson Wildcats football team represented Davidson College as a member of the Southern Conference during the 1979 NCAA Division I-AA football season. Led by sixth-year head coach Ed Farrell, the Wildcats compiled an overall record of 6–4.

Schedule

References

Davidson
Davidson Wildcats football seasons
Davidson Wildcats football